Telegonus alardus, the frosted flasher, is a species of dicot skipper in the butterfly family Hesperiidae. It is found in the Caribbean Sea, Central America, North America, and South America.

Subspecies
The following subspecies are recognised:
 Telegonus alardus alardus (Stoll, 1790)
 Telegonus alardus aquila Evans, 1952
 Telegonus alardus latia Evans, 1952

References

Further reading

External links

 

Eudaminae
Articles created by Qbugbot
Butterflies described in 1790